János Paizs (2 April 1907 – 16 March 1978) was a Hungarian sprinter. He competed in the men's 100 metres at the 1928 Summer Olympics.

References

1907 births
1978 deaths
Athletes (track and field) at the 1928 Summer Olympics
Hungarian male sprinters
Olympic athletes of Hungary
Place of birth missing